Brooke High School is a public high school in Wellsburg, West Virginia, United States.  It is the only high school in the Brooke County School District. Athletic teams compete as the Brooke Bruins in the WVSSAC Class AAA as well as the Ohio Valley Athletic Conference.

History
Brooke High School was established in 1969 from the consolidation of Follansbee High School, Wellsburg High School, and Bethany High School

Athletics

Basketball
The Bruins have five basketball teams, both boys and girls. Boys play freshman, JV and varsity while girls compete in JV and varsity.

The boys' varsity basketball team won the WV AAA championship in 1987.

Cheerleading
The various varsity cheerleading squads have earned the school a record-setting 13 West Virginia state titles and 25 Region 1 championships. Brooke has also competed in the Ohio Valley Athletic Conference Cheerleading championship winning various titles – most recently in 2011.

Football
Brooke High School won the WV AAA championship in 1985, 1987, and 1990.

Marching Band 
The Brooke High School Marching Band is currently under the direction of Johnny Leonard. In the summer of 2022, the band performed the school's fight song "Green and Gold" at Walt Disney World.

Notable Alumni

Joe Pettini 
Pettini is a former Major League Baseball player who played for the San Francisco Giants and coached the St. Louis Cardinals and the Houston Astros.

References

Educational institutions established in 1969
Public high schools in West Virginia
Schools in Brooke County, West Virginia
1969 establishments in West Virginia